Liberty Bell Park (Gan Pa'amon HaDror), is a park in Jerusalem containing a replica of the Liberty Bell from which it gets its name. It is located near the Talbiyeh, German Colony, and Yemin Moshe neighborhoods.

Founded in 1976 to celebrate the USA's bicentennial and covering 9 acres, it is the most popular park in the city. It includes sports facilities, a picnic area, a 1,000-seat amphitheater, a music corner and areas for exhibitions, folk dancing and performances.

The park features Jerry the Dragon, a concrete play sculpture by Ulrik Plesner, the Danish-born Israeli architect who designed the park.

The Train Theater, a children's puppet theater, is housed in an old railway carriage at the northern end of Liberty Bell Park.

See also
Liberty Bell Park bus bombing
Tourism in Israel

References

External links 

 Park website on the Jerusalem municipality website

Parks in Jerusalem